Lava Canyon is a canyon on the Chilko River in the Chilcotin District of the Interior of British Columbia, Canada, located about 35 kilometres below the Chilko's outflow from the foot of Chilko Lake.

Lava Canyon is named for the columnar basalt cliffs that form the canyon from former extensive volcanic activity of this region.

See also
Anahim Volcanic Belt
Chilcotin Group
Anahim hotspot

References
BCGNIS listing "Lava Canyon (canyon)"

Canyons and gorges of British Columbia
Landforms of the Chilcotin